MLP-3 may refer to:

 Mobile Launch Platform 3, formerly used by NASA's Shuttle program
 USS Lewis B. Puller (ESB-3), formerly known as T-MLP-3